7 Squadron or 7th Squadron may refer to:

 No. 7 Squadron RAAF, a unit of the Royal Australian Air Force 
 No. 7 Squadron, Indian Air Force 
 No. 7 Squadron RNZAF, a unit of the Royal New Zealand Air Force 
 No. 7 Squadron PAF, Pakistan Air Force
 7 Squadron SAAF, a unit of the South African Air Force 
 No. 7 Squadron RAF, a unit of the United Kingdom Royal Air Force
 7th Squadron (JASDF), a unit of the Japan Air Self-Defense Force
 7th Tactical Squadron, Polish Air Force
 7th Cruiser Squadron (United Kingdom), a blockading force of the Royal Navy during the World War I
 7th Squadron, Rhode Island Cavalry, a unit of the Union Army during the American Civil War 
 7th Observation Squadron, later 7th Reconnaissance Squadron, United States Army Air Force; see 303d Tactical Reconnaissance Squadron
 7th Aero Squadron, later 7th Observation Squadron, later 7th Reconnaissance Squadron, United States Army Air Force; see 397th Bombardment Squadron

United States Air Force
 7th Airlift Squadron
 7th Air Refueling Squadron
 7th Bombardment Squadron
 7th Expeditionary Airborne Command and Control Squadron
 7th Fighter Squadron
 7th Intelligence Squadron
 7th Reconnaissance Squadron; see 397th Bombardment Squadron
 7th Tactical Reconnaissance Squadron
 7th Photographic Reconnaissance Squadron
 7th Space Operations Squadron
 7th Space Warning Squadron
 7th Special Operations Squadron
 7th Weather Squadron